Mansurwal Dona  is a village in Kapurthala district of Punjab State, India. The village is administrated by a Sarpanch, who is an elected representative.

Demography 
According to the report published by Census India in 2011, Mansurwal Dona has 124 houses with the total population of 644 persons of which 340 are male and 304 females. Literacy rate of  Mansurwal Dona is 68.41%, lower than the state average of 75.84%.  The population of children in the age group 0–6 years is 90 which is 13.98% of the total population. Child sex ratio is approximately 915, higher than the state average of 846.

Population data

References

External links
  Villages in Kapurthala
 Kapurthala Villages List

Villages in Kapurthala district